Folarin Falana  (born 27 October 1990), better known by his stage name Falz, is a Nigerian rapper, songwriter and actor who began his career while in secondary school after forming a group called The School Boys with his friend before his professional career as a music artist began in 2009. Falz became more well-known after releasing the song "Marry Me" featuring vocals from Poe and Yemi Alade.

He currently owns an independent record label called Bahd Guys Records. He released his debut album Wazup Guy in 2014. His second album Stories That Touch was released in 2015. He released 27 in 2017, and his fourth studio album Moral Instruction in 2019. In 2023, Naijabanquet observes that Falz renews his pledge as utilitarian artist in "O wa", a song which dwells on issues such as mis-governance and leadership crises in Nigeria and the quest for a new breed of leaders in the country.

Early life and education
Falz was born in the local government area of Mushin, Lagos State, to lawyers and human right activists Funmi and Femi Falana. He was called to the bar in 2012 after graduating from the Nigeria Law School in Abuja. Falz completed his basic and secondary school education at St. Leo's Catholic Primary School, Ikeja and Olashore International School, Osun State respectively. He is an alumnus of the University of Reading England, having graduated with an LLB honors degree in Law.

Career

2009–2013: Beginnings and Shakara: The Mixtape
Falz started music as a hobby while in secondary school. He formed a music group with a friend called "The School Boys". In 2009, he released a compilation of some of his recordings as a mixtape titled Shakara: The Mixtape.

In 2011, Falz released a single titled "Wahz Up Guy", then released "High Class" and "Currency", which gained him grounds in the Nigerian music industry.

2014–2016: Wazzup Guy, Stories That Touch and Chemistry EP
On January 2, 2014, Falz was listed in tooXclusive'''s "Artistes To Watch in 2014". On 30 May 2014, Falz released his debut studio album titled Wazup Guy, the album featured productions from the likes of Studio Magic, DJ Woske, Tin Tin and Spellz, among others. Wazzup Guy houses 18 tracks with guest appearances from Olamide, Show Dem Camp, Phenom, and Yemi Alade. Some of the tracks are: "See Me", "Toyin Tomato", "Senator", "Right Now", "Jessica", "High Class", "Marry Me", "Oh God", "The Advice" and "Cool Parry",  which was critically acclaimed by music critics.   

On 31st January 2015, Falz returned with an official single titled "Ello Bae". Actually, it was his first solo effort after the release, of Wazzup Guy and it won him several awards. Falz was strategic, about the launch of the music as it was launched just before the valentine's season.   

In 2015, Falz was nominated in the "Best Collaboration of The Year" category at the 2015 Nigeria Entertainment Awards for his chart-topping single "Marry Me". It won him a nomination in the "Best Collaboration of The Year" category at the 2015 Nigeria Entertainment Awards. He was also nominated in the "Best Rap Act of The Year" and "Best New Act to Watch" categories.

On 31 January 2015, he released a single titled "Ello Bae", which made a nominee in the "Best Street Hop Artiste of The Year" category at 2015 The Headies award.

On 3 November 2015, he announced the release of his second studio album, titled Stories That Touch, which was released on 17 November.

In 2016, Falz won "Best Actor in a Comedy Movie/Series" at the 2016 Africa Magic Viewers Choice Awards for his role as Segun in Funke Akindele's TV series Jenifa's Diary. In June 2016, Falz was voted the winner of the "Viewer's Choice Best New International Act" category at the 2016 BET Awards.

On October 27, 2016, Falz collaborated with Simi to release Chemistry, a seven-track EP solely produced by Sess. Falz had previously worked with Simi on the singles "Jamb Question" and "Soldier".

2017–Present: 27 and acting career
On 27 October 2017, his 27th birthday, Falz released a new album titled 27 to celebrate the day. This was a surprise album, as it was not promoted before its release. It contained 17 tracks including hit singles like "Bhad Baddo Baddest", "Wehdone sir", and "Something light". It featured prominent music acts like Davido, Olamide, Burna Boy, Wande Coal, Maleek Berry, Sir Dauda, Medikal, Terry Apala, and Ycee. The album was majorly produced by Sess as an in-house producer, with some tracks done by Maleek Berry, and studio magic. The album did very well and it gained several awards and nominations, including a nomination for The Headies Award for Rap Album of the Year.

In May 2018, Falz released a music video titled "This Is Nigeria" which was inspired by Childish Gambino's "This is America". It highlighted Nigerian issues including corruption and bribery.

Months later, the song was banned by the NBC (National Broadcasting Commission) claiming it was a vulgar song. When Falz was asked, he said: “If they ban this song, then I do not understand them because that song is definitely not a vulgar song,”.  However, Falz sues NBC for N100 Million. 

On September 1, 2018, Falz won "Best Supporting Actor" at the 2018 Africa Magic Viewers' Choice Awards for his role as Quam in Tope Oshin Ogun's movie New Money, becoming the first Nigerian musician to have won the Africa Magic Viewers' Choice Awards twice.

In August 2020, Falz unveiled his film production company with the name House21TV. While unveiling the new film production company Falz also took to Instagram to unveil an all new comedy series, Therapy, to air exclusively on YouTube.

In March 2022, Falz announced on his Instagram page that he will be doing things a little differently this year having deleted all his post from the past year assuring that it’s a new dispensation by dropping is first official single for the year with BNXN also called Buju titled "Ice Cream". He also got a van with a ticketing booth imprinted with Falz Ice Cream giving spreading love to people by giving free ice cream within the cities of Lagos.

Artistry
Falz describes his style of music as "Wahzup music". It is the fusion of comic lyrics with contemporary hip-hop in a faux Yoruba accent.

On 18 November 2014, Falz was ranked #9 on notJustOk's list of "The 10 Most Gifted Rappers In Nigeria 2014", stating that, “Falz’s ability to maintain a thought and get his point across in 16 barz while switching accents, infusing funny punchlines and delivering all of it in a way that makes the listener follow along is nothing short of impressive”.

EndSARS protest

In October 2020, Falz called on Runtown and other Nigerian celebrities to join the #EndSARS protests in Lagos, South West Nigeria, calling on the government to end police brutality. The singer is vocal about issues bordering on social justice across the country. Paying tribute to the victims of police brutality, he released a music video for "Johnny", the first single off his last album, Moral Instruction. 
He wrote in a post introducing the song, "We will never forget the heroes that have been unlawfully slain. This is for them. For every single Nigerian life snatched away unlawfully, we must make sure we get justice."
"Almost two years since I released the audio. Even more disturbing to think that as time passed, the message became more relevant."

In an interview with CNN's Christiane Amanpour, in 2020, Falz said President Buhari's promise to reform the Nigerian police was infuriating and frustrating as he claimed Buhari has been making same promise since 2017.

Discography

Studio albumsWazup Guy (2014)Stories that Touch (2015)27 (2017)Moral Instruction (2019)BAHD'' (2022)

Filmography

Awards and nominations

References
40.  https://guardian.ng/saturday-magazine/falz-teams-up-with-bnxn-in-new-single-ice-cream/

External links

1990 births
Living people
End SARS activists
21st-century Nigerian male singers
People from Lagos State
Nigerian hip hop musicians
Alumni of the University of Reading
Rappers from Lagos
Falana family
Nigerian male actors
Nigerian Law School alumni
Yoruba male actors
Male actors from Lagos
Nigerian film actors